The West Linn-Wilsonville School District (3J) is a school district that serves  southwest of metropolitan Portland, Oregon. In addition to the cities of West Linn and Wilsonville, the district's boundaries encompass unincorporated areas of southwestern Clackamas County, including the hamlet of Stafford. A small portion of the city of Tualatin is also within the district's boundaries.

The superintendent is Kathy Ludwig. As of September 2017, there were approximately 9,900 students enrolled at schools in the district.

Demographics
In the 2009 school year, the district had 40 students classified as homeless by the Department of Education, or 0.5% of students in the district.

Schools

The West Linn-Wilsonville School District has nine elementary schools, four middle schools, three high schools, and one charter school.

Primary schools (grades K-5)
Boeckman Creek
Bolton
Boones Ferry
Cedaroak Park
Stafford
Sunset
Willamette
Lowrie
Trillium Creek

Middle schools (grades 6-8) 
Athey Creek
Inza R. Wood
Rosemont Ridge
Meridian Creek

High schools (grades 9-12)
Riverside High School (Under Construction)
West Linn High School
Wilsonville High School

Charter schools
Three Rivers (grades 4-8)

School Board and Public Meetings

Curriculum

References

External links

Tualatin, Oregon
West Linn, Oregon
Wilsonville, Oregon
Education in Washington County, Oregon
School districts in Oregon
Education in Clackamas County, Oregon